Heidenreichstein (archaic ) is a town in the district of Gmünd in the Austrian state of Lower Austria.

Population

References

External links

Municipal website

Cities and towns in Gmünd District